Gavin Kramer (born 1961) is a British writer. He was born in London and studied at Cambridge University. His debut novel Shopping won the David Higham Prize and the Geoffrey Faber Memorial Prize.

References

British writers
1961 births
Living people
Writers from London
Date of birth missing (living people)
Alumni of the University of Cambridge